

See also 
 Districts of Mauritius
 List of places in Mauritius

References 

Populated places in Mauritius
Savanne District